Shahid Rajai may refer to the following things named after assassinated (1981 Iranian Prime Minister's office bombing) Iranian president Mohammad-Ali Rajai:
 Eskaleh-ye Shahid Rajai, Hormozgan Province
 Shahid Rajai, Ilam
 Shahid Rajai, Khuzestan
 Shahid Rajai, Kuhdasht, Lorestan Province
 Shahid Rajai, Pol-e Dokhtar, Lorestan Province
 Shahid Rajai construction site, South Khorasan Province
 Shahid Rajaee Dam
 Shahid Rajaei Stadium
 Shahid Rajaee University

See also
 Shahrak-e Shahid Rajai (disambiguation)